Klyve (also known as Kløve) is a hamlet and basic statistical unit (grunnkrets) in the municipality of Voss in Vestland county, Norway.

Klyve includes Nedra Klyve (or Nedra Kløve; literally, 'lower Klyve'; elevation ) to the south and Øvre Klyve (or Øvre Kløve; literally, 'upper Klyve'; elevation ) to the north. The settlement is accessible via Norwegian County Road 307, also known as Raundalsvegen 'Raun Valley Road'.

The settlement was attested as Klyufua in 1427 (and as af Kliffwa in 1463 and Klufa in 1490, among other names). The original name is reconstructed as *Kljúfar from the Old Norse verb kljúfa 'split, cleave', referring to its location between two hills.

References

External links
Klyve at FINN kart
Klyve at Norgeskart

Voss
Villages in Vestland